The Sarajevo Canton, officially the Canton of Sarajevo, is one of 10 cantons of the Federation of Bosnia and Herzegovina in Bosnia and Herzegovina. Its cantonal seat is the city of Sarajevo, also the capital city of Bosnia and Herzegovina.

The Canton represents the metro area of the country's capital city, Sarajevo, together with the City of East Sarajevo. It contains 97% of the city's population, but a much smaller percentage of the official land area. The majority of the population is Bosniak (83,8%).

History

The history of Sarajevo dates back to Neolithic times, when the Butmir culture made its mountains and hills their home. In ancient times, the Sarajevo area (Canton) was occupied by the Illyrians. The local tribe, the Daesitates, controlled most of the area. They were a warlike bunch and the last Illyrian tribe to resist Roman rule, which finally came in AD 9. Under Roman rule, many roads were constructed in the region, as well as a city on top of modern-day Ilidža. During the Middle Ages, the area of Sarajevo Canton was a key part of the Bosnian Kingdom. The toponym Vrhbosna existed somewhere in the region and was one of the notable settlements at the time.

True development of the region came after the Ottoman conquest when local Muslim noble Isa-Beg Isaković established the roots of the modern city of Sarajevo, between 1461 and 1463. The region grew along with the city, which quickly, after Istanbul, became the most important in the Balkans. Later rule by Austria-Hungary modernized and westernized the region. Under Yugoslavia, there was major development of the area, which more than tripled in size. Because of its ideal geographical location in between mountains, Sarajevo was chosen to host the 1984 Winter Olympics. Much of this progress was offset however by the Yugoslav Wars in the early 1990s.

The Sarajevo Canton was a result of this warfare, created by the Washington Accords in 1994, and its boundaries defined by the Dayton Accords in 1995.

Government
Like all Cantons of the Federation of Bosnia and Herzegovina, the head of the Sarajevo Canton is called the Prime Minister. The current acting Prime Minister is Darja Softić-Kadenić (since 25 January 2023). Like many other heads of executive branches of government in the world, the Prime Minister has a cabinet which helps him go about his duties. The Sarajevo Canton also has ministries, services, and agencies to help in the running of the region.

The Canton is split into 9 municipalities. They are all based on the major settlements in their region, except for Sarajevo, whose size and status as capital city gives it four separate municipalities and its own separate city government. Major cities are in municipalities of the same name in Bosnia and Herzegovina (i.e. Ilidža is part of Ilidža Municipality) whose governments are the de facto city government as their jurisdiction covers the city and all major suburbs.

Agencies of Sarajevo Canton
Agency for Cantonal Development
Agency for Reserves of Goods
Agency for Cantonal Information and Statistics
Agency for the Planning of Cantonal Growth
Professional Fire-Extinguishing Brigade

Geography
The Sarajevo Canton has a typical Bosnian geography. It is located close to the geometric center of the country, and contains numerous mountains, including Bjelašnica, Igman, Jahorina, Trebević, and Treskavica. The cities of the Canton are built predominantly on the hills at the foot of these mountains, and the fields in between them. The most significant of these is the Sarajevo field, a small depression upon which the bulk of the city is built upon. The Miljacka river passes through the Canton. Vrelo Bosne, the source of the Bosna River, is found in Sarajevo Canton and is the source of water for most residents of Sarajevo.

Economy
Sarajevo is economically strongest region in the whole of Bosnia and Herzegovina. The city and canton generate more than 37% of the Bosnian-Herzegovinian GDP.

The economy of Sarajevo Canton is slowly growing better, although it has been severely weakened by the Siege of Sarajevo and is still drastically weaker than it used to be during Yugoslav period. The employment rate in Bosnia and Herzegovina is 45.5% officially; however, grey economy may reduce actual unemployment to between 25 and 30%, while in Sarajevo the official unemployment rate is around 15% of the labour force.

Major industries in the region include tourism, food processing, manufacturing and IT. Several major Bosnian companies are based in the Canton such as Bosnalijek and Bosna Bank International. The area also holds the country footholds of numerous foreign corporations, such as Coca-Cola, Raiffeisen Bank, Ziraat Bank, Al Jazeera, Volkswagen, among many others.

Demographics
The Sarajevo Canton contains Sarajevo and its metro area. Since the city is the largest in Bosnia and Herzegovina, it is also one of the most populous Cantons of Bosnia and Herzegovina. According to the 2013 population census, the overall population of Sarajevo Canton is 413.593. 84% of population are ethnic Bosniaks, 4,2% Croats, and 3,2% Serbs.

The population density of Sarajevo Canton is some 350 people per km². 15.8% of the Canton's population are youth up to 14 years of age, 67.8% are between 15 and 64 years of age, and some 16.4% are over 65 years of age.

Of the nine municipalities, the biggest population belongs to Novi Grad, with some 125.626 residents, and the smallest population was in Trnovo, which has a mere 2.850 residents.

∗ 1961–1981 censuses

∗ 1991 census

∗ 2013 census

Municipalities

The Sarajevo Canton consists of 9 municipalities, of which 4 comprise the city of Sarajevo:

See also
List of heads of the Sarajevo Canton

References

External links

Official Web Site
Regional Representation to the EU in Brussels
Tourism Association of Sarajevo Canton

 
Cantons of the Federation of Bosnia and Herzegovina
1995 establishments in Bosnia and Herzegovina
States and territories established in 1995